The Kört-Aika Monument is a steel statue located at the entrance to the village of Kortkeros, Kortkerossky District, Komi Republic, Russia. It is a statue of a man pulling up several boats with his chains.

Features

History
Yuri Shagunov, president of the Russian Union of Blacksmiths, commissioned the monument's construction to two blacksmiths, Alexander Sushnikov (from St. Petersburg) and Georgii Gorbachev (from Moscow). It was initially installed in the courtyard of a local blacksmith, Igor Usachev, before being built at the village's entrance on November 12.

Controversy
Some residents objected to the statue's existence, as they considered it to promote a revival of the native Komi religion. Furthermore, some residents also considered the statue to be a monument of a robber.

In response, the statue's creators stated that it is not a pagan monument, but a work of art. The local diocese of the Russian Orthodox Church also stated that the statue does not bear any religious or ideological motive.

See also
 Komi mythology

References

External links
 International Festival of Blacksmith Art "Kort Aika" (Russian)

Buildings and structures in the Komi Republic
Outdoor sculptures in Russia
2016 sculptures
Buildings and structures completed in 2016
Monuments and memorials in Russia
Culture of the Komi Republic